Valentine's day mascara is an artwork by Banksy that appeared on the side of a house in Margate, Kent, on 14 February, Valentine's Day, 2023. The work depicts a woman shutting a man in a refrigerator.

Description 
The piece is painted on the side of a house on Park Place, to the rear of Grosvenor Place in Margate. It depicts an injured woman with a missing tooth and 'swollen eye' dressed as a housewife from the 1950s shutting a man in a freezer. She is dressed in a blue apron with yellow washing up gloves.

The work incorporates a refrigerator that had been abandoned in the street next to the house. Thanet District Council removed the fridge after the appearance of the artwork, claiming the "fridge freezer which is believed to have been part of the installation has been removed by council operatives on the grounds of safety as it was on public land", and would be returned once it had been 'made safe'. Other items by the piece were removed including an empty beer bottle, a broken garden chair and a crate.

History 
The Thanet District Council said they would contact the property owner to discuss the preservation of the artwork. The owner subsequently contacted an art gallery to help preserve the artwork and said that she was "trying to balance the needs of the tenant and the local art community".

The work was posted by Banksy on his Instagram page. It has been interpreted as statement about violence against women. Local residents expressed shock that the area had been cleaned by the council so quickly, with complaints about rubbish usually taking weeks to resolve.

Banksy created another work on Valentine's Day in Bristol in 2018.

References

2020s murals
2023 in England
2023 paintings
Culture in Kent
Graffiti in the United Kingdom
Margate
Paintings of women
Public art in England
Works by Banksy